A high people's court or higher people's court (高级人民法院) is the highest local court in the People's Republic of China. In each province, it is subject to the "People's Congress".

According to the Organic Law of the People's Courts of the People's Republic of China, the courts are responsible for issues at the provincial level. National matters are handled by the Supreme People's Court.

The President of each high people's court is appointed by the People's Congress. Judges are appointed by the "Standing Committee" of the People's Congress.

References

See also 

 Judicial system of China
 Local people's court

Judiciary of China